Herpetogramma albipennis is a moth in the family Crambidae. It was described by Hiroshi Inoue in 2000. It is found in Japan.

References

Moths described in 2000
Herpetogramma
Moths of Japan